Asish Chakraborty (আশীষ চক্রবর্ত্তী), also known as Nanti da, is an Indian politician from  Paschim Medinipur, West Bengal, India.

He is a Member of Legislative Assembly (M.L.A.) from No. 233 Garbeta (Vidhan Sabha constituency), West Bengal. He was elected as an All India Trinamool Congress candidate from Garbeta in the 2016 Assembly election.

He is Paschim Medinipur District Working President (জেলা কার্যকারী সভাপতি)  of the All India Trinamool Congress.

He is Vice President of District Sports Association, Midnapore.

Personal Details

Assembly election 2016
In the 2016 elections, Asish Chakraborty of All India Trinamool Congress defeated his nearest rival Sorforoj Khan of CPI(M) by 61,157 votes.

See also
 Mamata Banerjee
 Suvendu Adhikari
 All India Trinamool Congress
 Garbeta (Vidhan Sabha constituency)
 2016 West Bengal Legislative Assembly election

References

 
 
 
 

West Bengal MLAs 2016–2021
Trinamool Congress politicians from West Bengal
Living people
Year of birth missing (living people)